"I'm Gonna Wash That Man Right Outa My Hair" is a song from the musical South Pacific, sung by Nellie Forbush, the female lead, originally played by Mary Martin in the 1949 Broadway production. Her character, fed up with a man (Emile De Becque) and singing energetically in the shower, claims that she will forget about him.  The song was written by Rodgers and Hammerstein in response to Martin's request.  She had starred on Broadway for years and Martin suggested that she wash her hair on stage during the performance.

Adaptations 
The song was adapted into a commercial jingle for Clairol hair coloring ("I'm gonna wash that gray right outa my hair") in the early 1980s. PJ Harvey referenced the song in her 1992 single "Sheela-Na-Gig" with the repeated lyric "gonna wash that man right outa my hair". 50 Foot Wave's song "Bone China" also references this song in the lyric, "Gonna wash that man right out of my head / and soap him into my eyes".

The song was covered in the 2004 film Connie and Carla by the title characters (portrayed by Nia Vardalos and Toni Collette).

Recordings 
Diana Miller, Arne Domnérus and his orchestra. Recorded in Stockholm on September 22, 1952. It was released on the 78rpm record His Master's Voice X 7829.
The Weather Girls for their 1983 album Success.
Boyfriend released her cover simply titled "Wash That" in November 2018.

References

Songs about heartache
1949 songs
Songs from South Pacific (musical)
Songs from South Pacific (1958 film)
Songs with feminist themes
Songs with music by Richard Rodgers
Songs with lyrics by Oscar Hammerstein II